Lanatoside C (or isolanid) is a cardiac glycoside, a type of drug that can be used in the treatment of congestive heart failure and cardiac arrhythmia (irregular heartbeat). Lanatoside C can be used orally or by the intravenous route. It is marketed in a number of countries and is also available in generic form. Its main indications are rapid response atrial fibrilation and paroxysmal supraventricular tachycardia, two common types of arrhythmia.

It is found in Digitalis lanata.

Chemistry 
The substance is composed of four monosaccharides (glucose, 3-acetyldigitoxose and two digitoxoses) and an aglycon named digoxigenin.

References 

Cardenolides